Bioremediation broadly refers to any process wherein a biological system (typically bacteria, microalgae, fungi, and plants), living or dead, is employed for removing environmental pollutants from air, water, soil, flue gasses, industrial effluents etc., in natural or artificial settings. The natural ability of organisms to adsorb, accumulate, and degrade common and emerging pollutants has attracted the use of biological resources in treatment of contaminated environment. In comparison to conventional physicochemical treatment methods bioremediation may offer considerable advantages as it aims to be sustainable, eco-friendly, cheap, and scalable.
Most bioremediation is inadvertent, involving native organisms. Research on bioremediation is heavily focused on stimulating the process by inoculation of a polluted site with organisms or supplying nutrients to promote the growth.  In principle, bioremediation could be used to reduce the impact of byproducts created from anthropogenic activities, such as industrialization and agricultural processes. Bioremediation could prove less expensive and more sustainable than other remediation alternatives.

UNICEF, power producers, bulk water suppliers and local governments are early adopters of low cost bioremediation, such as aerobic bacteria  tablets which are simply dropped into water.

Organic pollutants are generally more susceptible to biodegradation than heavy metals. Typical bioremediations involves oxidations. Oxidations enhance the water-solubility of organic compounds and their susceptibility to further degradation by further oxidation and hydrolysis. Ultimately biodegradation converts hydrocarbons to carbon dioxide and water.  For heavy metals, bioremediation offers few solutions. Metal-containing pollutant can be removed or reduced with varying bioremediation techniques. The main challenge to bioremediations is rate: the processes are slow.

Bioremediation techniques can be classified as (i) in situ techniques, which treats polluted sites directly, vs (ii) ex situ techniques which are applied to excavated materials. In both these approaches, additional nutrients, vitamins, minerals, and pH buffers are added to enhance the growth and metabolism of the microorganisms. In some cases, specialized microbial cultures are added (biostimulation). Some examples of bioremediation related technologies are phytoremediation, bioventing, bioattenuation, biosparging, composting (biopiles and windrows), and landfarming. Other remediation techniques include thermal desorption, vitrification, air stripping, bioleaching, rhizofiltration, and soil washing. Biological treatment, bioremediation, is a similar approach used to treat wastes including wastewater, industrial waste and solid waste. The end goal of bioremediation is to remove or reduce harmful compounds to improve soil and water quality.

In situ techniques

Bioventing 
Bioventing is a process that increases the oxygen or air flow into the unsaturated zone of the soil, this in turn increases the rate of natural in situ degradation of the targeted hydrocarbon contaminant. Bioventing, an aerobic bioremediation, is the most common form of oxidative bioremediation process where oxygen is provided as the electron acceptor for oxidation of petroleum, polyaromatic hydrocarbons (PAHs), phenols, and other reduced pollutants. Oxygen is generally the preferred electron acceptor because of the higher energy yield and because oxygen is required for some enzyme systems to initiate the degradation process. Microorganisms can degrade a wide variety of hydrocarbons, including components of gasoline, kerosene, diesel, and jet fuel. Under ideal aerobic conditions, the biodegradation rates of the low- to moderate-weight aliphatic, alicyclic, and aromatic compounds can be very high. As molecular weight of the compound increases, the resistance to biodegradation increases simultaneously. This results in higher contaminated volatile compounds due to their high molecular weight and an increased difficulty to remove from the environment.

Most bioremediation processes involve oxidation-reduction reactions where either an electron acceptor (commonly oxygen) is added to stimulate oxidation of a reduced pollutant (e.g. hydrocarbons) or an electron donor (commonly an organic substrate) is added to reduce oxidized pollutants (nitrate, perchlorate, oxidized metals, chlorinated solvents, explosives and propellants). In both these approaches, additional nutrients, vitamins, minerals, and pH buffers may be added to optimize conditions for the microorganisms. In some cases, specialized microbial cultures are added (bioaugmentation) to further enhance biodegradation.

Approaches for oxygen addition below the water table include recirculating aerated water through the treatment zone, addition of pure oxygen or peroxides, and air sparging. Recirculation systems typically consist of a combination of injection wells or galleries and one or more recovery wells where the extracted groundwater is treated, oxygenated, amended with nutrients and re-injected. However, the amount of oxygen that can be provided by this method is limited by the low solubility of oxygen in water (8 to 10 mg/L for water in equilibrium with air at typical temperatures). Greater amounts of oxygen can be provided by contacting the water with pure oxygen or addition of hydrogen peroxide (H2O2) to the water. In some cases, slurries of solid calcium or magnesium peroxide are injected under pressure through soil borings. These solid peroxides react with water releasing H2O2 which then decomposes releasing oxygen. Air sparging involves the injection of air under pressure below the water table. The air injection pressure must be great enough to overcome the hydrostatic pressure of the water and resistance to air flow through the soil.

Biostimulation 

Bioremediation can be carried out by bacteria that are naturally present. In biostimulation, the population of these helpful bacteria can be increased by adding nutrients.

Bacteria can in principle be used to degrade hydrocarbons. Specific to marine oil spills, nitrogen and phosphorus have been key nutrients in biodegradation.  The bioremediation of hydrocarbons suffers from low rates.

Bioremediation can involve the action of microbial consortium. Within the consortium, the product of one species could be the substrate for another species.

Anaerobic bioremediation can in principle be employed to treat a range of oxidized contaminants including chlorinated ethylenes (PCE, TCE, DCE, VC), chlorinated ethanes (TCA, DCA), chloromethanes (CT, CF), chlorinated cyclic hydrocarbons, various energetics (e.g., perchlorate, RDX, TNT), and nitrate. This process involves the addition of an electron donor to: 1) deplete background electron acceptors including oxygen, nitrate, oxidized iron and manganese and sulfate; and 2) stimulate the biological and/or chemical reduction of the oxidized pollutants.  Hexavalent chromium (Cr[VI]) and uranium (U[VI]) can be reduced to less mobile and/or less toxic forms (e.g., Cr[III], U[IV]). Similarly, reduction of sulfate to sulfide (sulfidogenesis) can be used to precipitate certain metals (e.g., zinc, cadmium). The choice of substrate and the method of injection depend on the contaminant type and distribution in the aquifer, hydrogeology, and remediation objectives. Substrate can be added using conventional well installations, by direct-push technology, or by excavation and backfill such as permeable reactive barriers (PRB) or biowalls. Slow-release products composed of edible oils or solid substrates tend to stay in place for an extended treatment period. Soluble substrates or soluble fermentation products of slow-release substrates can potentially migrate via advection and diffusion, providing broader but shorter-lived treatment zones. The added organic substrates are first fermented to hydrogen (H2) and volatile fatty acids (VFAs). The VFAs, including acetate, lactate, propionate and butyrate, provide carbon and energy for bacterial metabolism.

Bioattenuation 
During bioattenuation, biodegradation occurs naturally with the addition of nutrients or bacteria. The indigenous microbes present will determine the metabolic activity and act as a natural attenuation. While there is no anthropogenic involvement in bioattenuation, the contaminated site must still be monitored.

Biosparging 
Biosparging is the process of groundwater remediation as oxygen, and possible nutrients, is injected. When oxygen is injected, indigenous bacteria are stimulated to increase rate of degradation. However, biosparging focuses on saturated contaminated zones, specifically related to ground water remediation.

Ex situ techniques

Biopiles 
Biopiles, similar to bioventing, are used to reduce petroleum pollutants by introducing aerobic hydrocarbons to contaminated soils. However, the soil is excavated and piled with an aeration system. This aeration system enhances microbial activity by introducing oxygen under positive pressure or removes oxygen under negative pressure.

Windrows 

Windrow systems are similar to compost techniques where soil is periodically turned in order to enhance aeration. This periodic turning also allows contaminants present in the soil to be uniformly distributed which accelerates the process of bioremediation.

Landfarming 
Landfarming, or land treatment, is a method commonly used for sludge spills. This method disperses contaminated soil and aerates the soil by cyclically rotating. This process is an above land application and contaminated soils are required to be shallow in order for microbial activity to be stimulated. However, if the contamination is deeper than 5 feet, then the soil is required to be excavated to above ground.

Heavy metals
Heavy metals become present in the environment due to anthropogenic activities or natural factors. Anthropogenic activities include industrial emissions, electronic waste, and ore mining. Natural factors include mineral weathering, soil erosion, and forest fires. Heavy metals including cadmium, chromium, lead and uranium are unlike organic compounds and cannot be biodegraded. However, bioremediation processes can potentially be used to reduce the mobility of these material in the subsurface, reducing the potential for human and environmental exposure. Heavy metals from these factors are predominantly present in water sources due to runoff where it is uptake by marine fauna and flora.

The mobility of certain metals including chromium (Cr) and uranium (U) varies depending on the oxidation state of the material. Microorganisms can be used to reduce the toxicity and mobility of chromium by reducing hexavalent chromium, Cr(VI) to trivalent Cr (III). Uranium can be reduced from the more mobile U(VI) oxidation state to the less mobile U(IV) oxidation state.  Microorganisms are used in this process because the reduction rate of these metals is often slow unless catalyzed by microbial interactions  Research is also underway to develop methods to remove metals from water by enhancing the sorption of the metal to cell walls.  This approach has been evaluated for treatment of cadmium, chromium, and lead. Genetically modified bacteria has also been explored for use in sequestration of Arsenic. Phytoextraction processes concentrate contaminants in the biomass for subsequent removal.

Pesticides 
For various herbicides and other pesticides both aerobic- and anaerobic-heterotrophs have been investigated.

Limitations of bioremediation 
Bioremediation can be used to completely mineralize organic pollutants, to partially transform the pollutants, or alter their mobility.  Heavy metals and radionuclides are elements that cannot be biodegraded, but can be bio-transformed to less mobile forms. In some cases, microbes do not fully mineralize the pollutant, potentially producing a more toxic compound. For example, under anaerobic conditions, the reductive dehalogenation of TCE may produce dichloroethylene (DCE) and vinyl chloride (VC), which are suspected or known carcinogens. However, the microorganism Dehalococcoides can further reduce DCE and VC to the non-toxic product ethene. The molecular pathways for bioremediation are of considerable interest. In addition, knowing these pathways will help develop new technologies that can deal with sites that have uneven distributions of a mixture of contaminants.

Biodegradation requires microbial population with the metabolic capacity to degrade the pollutant. The biological processes used by these microbes are highly specific, therefore, many environmental factors must be taken into account and regulated as well. It can be difficult to extrapolate the results from the small-scale test studies into big field operations. In many cases, bioremediation takes more time than other alternatives such as land filling and incineration. Another example is bioventing, which is inexpensive to bioremediate contaminated sites, however, this process is extensive and can take a few years to decontaminate a site.>

In agricultural industries, the use of pesticides is a top factor in direct soil contamination and runoff water contamination. The limitation or remediation of pesticides is the low bioavailability. Altering the pH and temperature of the contaminated soil is a resolution to increase bioavailability which, in turn, increased degradation of harmful compounds.

The compound acrylonitrile is commonly produced in industrial setting but adversely contaminates soils. Microorganisms containing nitrile hydratases (NHase) degraded harmful acrylonitrile compounds into non-polluting substances.

Since the experience with harmful contaminants are limited, laboratory practices are required to evaluate effectiveness, treatment designs, and estimate treatment times. Bioremediation processes may take several months to several years depending on the size of the contaminated area.

Genetic engineering 
The use of genetic engineering to create organisms specifically designed for bioremediation is under preliminary research. Two category of genes can be inserted in the organism: degradative genes, which encode proteins required for the degradation of pollutants, and reporter genes, which encode proteins able to monitor pollution levels. Numerous members of Pseudomonas have been modified with the lux gene for the detection of the polyaromatic hydrocarbon naphthalene. A field test for the release of the modified organism has been successful on a moderately large scale.

There are concerns surrounding release and containment of genetically modified organisms into the environment due to the potential of horizontal gene transfer. Genetically modified organisms are classified and controlled under the Toxic Substances Control Act of 1976 under United States Environmental Protection Agency. Measures have been created to address these concerns. Organisms can be modified such that they can only survive and grow under specific sets of environmental conditions. In addition, the tracking of modified organisms can be made easier with the insertion of bioluminescence genes for visual identification.

Genetically modified organisms have been created to treat oil spills and break down certain plastics (PET).

See also 

 Bioremediation of radioactive waste
 Biosurfactant
 Chelation
 Dutch pollutant standards
 Folkewall
 In situ chemical oxidation
 In situ chemical reduction
 List of environment topics
 Mega Borg Oil Spill
 Microbial biodegradation
 Mycoremediation
 Mycorrhizal bioremediation
 Phytoremediation
 Pseudomonas putida (used for degrading oil)
 Restoration ecology
 Xenocatabolism

References

External links 
 Phytoremediation, hosted by the Missouri Botanical Garden
 To remediate or to not remediate?
Anaerobic Bioremediation

 
Biotechnology
Environmental soil science
Environmental engineering
Environmental terminology
Conservation projects
Ecological restoration
Soil contamination
Radioactive waste